Tacpac (derived from "tactile approach to communication package") is a sensory communication resource using touch and music to develop communication skills. It helps those who have sensory impairment or communication difficulties. It can also help those who have tactile defensiveness, learning difficulties, autism, Down syndrome, and dementia.

Design 
Tacpac uses music that matches the texture of the object for each activity so that those undergoing Tacpac have an aligned experience. Users can employ this to help them communicate. 

Tacpac comes in the form of a subscription that is accessed on a website and also via an app for phones and tablets. The resources include music tracks, instruction videos, and downloadable/printable record and instruction sheets. Users can play the music tracks without an internet connection.

Through repetition, a receiver learns to express responses that can be understood: e.g., those manifesting like/dislike; desire/rejection; and know/ignorance. Users can begin to respond to stimuli, anticipate activities and relate to the helper. These primal responses that comprise pre-intentional and affective communication can be crucial steps toward more clearly defined intentional communication and even language acquisition.

Special-needs educator Laura Pease writes:

Reception 
The number of research projects around Tacpac is growing and it has growing support amongst multi-sensory impairment networks and the UK's Royal National Institute of Blind People.

References

Bibliography 

 
 
 
  - research paper on Tacpac including perspectives of parents, speech and language therapists, physiotherapists, occupational therapists, and music therapists.

External links
 

Special education
Augmentative and alternative communication